Das Autogramm is a 1984 West German drama film directed by Peter Lilienthal. It was entered into the 34th Berlin International Film Festival.

Cast
 Juan José Mosalini as Daniel Galvan, der Sänger
 Ángel Del Villar as Tony Basilio Rocha, der Boxer (as Angel Del Villar)
 Anna Larreta as Ana Gallo, Tochter
 Hanns Zischler as Leutnant Suarez (as Hans Zischler)
 Nikolaus Dutsch as Sanchez, Bahnwärter (as Nicolas Dutsch)
 Georges Géret as Dr. Gallo (as Georges Geret)
 Pierre Bernard Douby as Ignaz Zuckermann 'Mingo'
 Vito Mata as Dicker
 Luís Lucas as Schwarzhaariger (as Luis Lucas)
 Dominique Nato as Sepulveda Marcial
 Agostinho Faleiro as Schiedsrichter
 Asdrubal Pereira as Morales
 Roman Pallares as Sänger

References

External links

1984 films
1984 drama films
German drama films
West German films
1980s German-language films
Films directed by Peter Lilienthal
Films shot in Portugal
Films about Latin American military dictatorships
1980s German films